Liahona Preparatory Academy is a regionally accredited private school in Utah County, Utah, United States, that offers instruction to students from pre-kindergarten through grade 12. The school was founded by Brent and Kolleen DeGraff.  In 2019, the DeGraffs retired and the school was sold to the Long Family and is currently run by Jordan Long, a graduate of and long time teacher/administrator at Liahona. The school blends core academics with the principles of the Church of Jesus Christ of Latter-day Saints.  Liahona has been in operation since 1998, and is named after an artifact described in The Book of Mormon.

Liahona teaches four basic classes: history, science, English, and math. It also offers electives such as Digital Journalism, Spanish, Kung-Fu, Various Theatre courses, and career exploration. Currently, the school has almost 200 on-campus students. In 2014, 2017, and 2018, Liahona was recognized by BestSchool.org, an independent ranking organization. Out of thousands of distance education programs nationwide, Liahona Preparatory Academy was ranked as one of the top 50 schools in America.

Location 
Liahona Preparatory Academy (grades Pre-K through 12) is located just off I-15 at 2464 West 450 South in Pleasant Grove, Utah.  Liahona Elementary (Pre-K to grade 4) is located at 801 North 300 East, Pleasant Grove.

Liahona has an accredited distance education system through Cognia. Each week, the students and teachers are filmed in the four core classes (History, Science, Math, and English). The weekly videos are available via the Internet and accessed by students worldwide.  Liahona also offers various electives and pre-filmed fast-track courses for students both on campus and in the distance education program.

Activities 
Liahona boasts a nationally award-winning drama department.  The school produces 3-6 shows each year in their black box theater on site, which includes their elementary, jr high and high school programs. {{citation needed span|Liahona has won 5 National High-school and 3 National Jr. High Shakespeare titles at the annual Utah Shakespeare Festival Competition in Cedar City, Utah.  They also have won 4 straight UHSAA Region and State titles in Drama from 2016–2020.  The 2020–2021 season includes W;t, Anastasisa, The Little Mermaid, The Merry Wives of Windsor, The War of the Roses, The Audience and Frozen Kids.  Liahona was invited to represent the United States at the Edinburgh Fringe Festival in Scotland in 2018 where they performed King John which fared well with critics.

Each year, Liahona students attend a week-long youth conference at Aspen Grove in Provo Canyon. There are activities, youth speakers, service projects, and entertainment. Liahona students also typically participate in a service trip. They have taken a service trip to Mexico to volunteer at the two orphanages that the school has adopted. Students participate in fundraising activities to raise money for the orphans. Students have also participated in a Christmas service project taking presents, food boxes, clothing, blankets, books, hygiene kits, and school supply bags to Navajo families near Chinle, Arizona. In 2019, students repaired homes and schools while also spending time with orphans and the homeless on the island of Luzon in The Philippines.

Students have the opportunity to gain elective credit by participating in the school's Digital Journalism course. The class is run using video conferencing, so students all over the world can participate. During the 2015-2016 school year, students ranging from Boston to Guam and in between held staff positions.

The school also has a robust Kung-Fu program where students learn and advance levels during on-site elective classes.

Athletics
Liahona has an athletic department that plays in the Utah School Sports Alliance. Their basketball team went 7-1 in 2007, winning the state championship against Lincoln Academy by 19.  Their soccer team went 12-0, beating Lincoln Academy in the state championship by two in a shoot-out. Liahona joined the Utah High School Activities Association in 2009. In 2010, while playing 1A UHSAA, Liahona took second in state in basketball. In 2012, Liahona left the UHSSA for sports and joined the newly formed Utah School Sports Alliance. In the USSA in 2014, Liahona's men's basketball team placed third in state, men's soccer placed second and women's soccer placed fourth. Liahona disbanded its sports program at the end of the 2014 season.

In 2019, Liahona re-entered the Utah School Sports Alliance for athletics.  In their first year back, the Women's Cross Country team took first at state with the men coming in third. In 2020, The women repeated as State Champions while also placing multiple runners in the top 5 including the top runner over all.  The men took 2nd overall while placing 2nd and 3rd individually.  A Jr. High Cross Country team was added with the women taking first at state.

Liahona started a Volleyball team in 2020 and in its first year saw the girls team make a Cinderella run to take 3rd at the state tournament in Layton, Utah.

References

External links 
 Official site
 Video

Private elementary schools in Utah
Private high schools in Utah
Private middle schools in Utah
Educational institutions established in 1996
Schools in Utah County, Utah
1996 establishments in Utah